The Pannonian Sea was a shallow ancient lake, where the Pannonian Basin in Central Europe is now.

History
The Pannonian Sea, for most of its history, was part of the Paratethys Sea, until about 10 million years ago, when a Miocene uplift of the Carpathian Mountains isolated the sea from the rest of Paratethys. 

During its first historical phase, the Pannonian Sea had a western connection with the Mediterranean Sea through the territories of the modern Ligurian Sea, Bavaria, and Vienna Basin. Through the Đerdap Strait, the Pannonian Sea was linked to the Paratethys in the Wallachian-Pontic Basin. The Pannonian Sea was also attached to the Aegean Sea through the modern Preševo Valley.

The Pannonian Sea existed for about 9 million years. Throughout its diverse history the salinity of the sea often shifted. The decrease of salinity resulted in endemic fauna. Eventually, the sea lost its connection to the Paratethys and became a lake permanently (Pannonian Lake). Its last remnant, the Slavonian Lake,  dried up in the Pleistocene epoch. The remnants of the former islands of the Pannonian Sea are the modern Pannonian island mountains (Mecsek, Papuk, Psunj, Krndija, Dilj, Fruška Gora, and Vršac Mountains). Despite their location, Lake Balaton and Lake Neusiedl, which appeared during the last 20,000 years, have no relation to the ancient sea.

See also

References

External links

 Map of the Pannonian Sea (in Hungarian)
 Map of the Pannonian Sea - reconstructed and in high-resolution (in English)

Ancient Croatia
Historical oceans
History of Transylvania
Miocene Europe
Natural history of Europe
Neogene paleogeography
Pannonian Plain
Pliocene Europe
Prehistoric Europe
Prehistoric Hungary
Prehistoric Serbia
Prehistory of Vojvodina
Paleontology in Serbia

cs:Paratethys